James Alexander Porterfield Rynd (6 April 1846 – 17 March 1917) was an Irish chess player and lawyer.

He was born on 6 April 1846 the son of Dublin solicitor James William Goodlatte Rynd and Isabella Susannah Stephens Rynd. Porterfield Rynd's uncle (his fathers half brother) was Dr. Francis Rynd the inventor of the hollow needle syringe. His cousin, Maria Rynd, was First Lady of Bolivia in 1879.

He won the Dublin Chess Congress No. 3 Tournament in 1865. This tournament, run alongside an international chess tournament in Dublin, was reserved for residents of Ireland and is widely considered to be the first Irish Chess Championship.

Porterfield Rynd's birth date is often listed incorrectly as 1855 this has led some books to cast doubt on his claim to the Irish championship in 1865, such as The Guinness Book of Chess Records by Ken Whyld. But further articles and his obituaries discount this and state he was born in 1846 and died aged 71 in 1917.

He was accepted as the Irish Chess Champion until 1886 when a tournament was hosted by the Irish Chess Association to find an Irish Champion. Rynd won the title again in 1892.
Porterfield Rynd held an LLB, in 1869 he entered the King's Inns, Dublin, and was called to the Bar in 1874. On 7 September 1869 he married Anna Cranwill and on 9 October 1873 his first child was born: Kenneth Arly Rynd.

Easily the most colourful personage in the place was Porterfield Rynd, one of the ablest members of the Dublin bar—a man who, if he had been half as devoted to the drudgery of work as he was to the allurement of play, could easily have attained the highest honours in the judiciary.

He was a member of Clontarf Tennis and Chess Club, and played many sports in his youth. Rynd was a member of Dublin Chess Club and played in the first ever Armstrong Cup, the oldest Irish league competition. He briefly wrote a column for the Irish Sportsman and Farmer.

In the 1890s Porterfield Rynd edited a chess column which regularly appeared on the back page of the Saturday issue of Dublin's Evening Herald. He was not burdened with modesty and the title Irish Champion appears beside his column.

He died in Dublin on 17 March 1917, his obituary was in the Irish Times of Monday 19 March 1917, RYND – 17 March 1917 JAMES ALEXANDER PORTERFIELD RYND, Barrister-at-Law, in his 71st year, and there was also an obituary in the Belfast Newsletter 22 March 1917.

Politics
Porterfield Rynd was a Unionist and produced pamphlet of his thoughts on the subject in 1906 for the Irish Unionist Association.

A letter of Rynd's outlining support for the unionist cause are contained in letters to Bonar Law, to whom the Colourful Rynd was described as being a confidante. Rynd was also associated with the Dublin Liberal Unionist Association, serving as its chairman.

References

1846 births
1917 deaths
Irish chess players
Alumni of King's Inns
19th-century chess players